Eveve is a company which provides restaurant reservation systems. The firm is the largest independently owned supplier in the industry, managing two million online diners per year, and is the largest supplier in Minnesota, booking more table reservations than its main rival OpenTable.

Founded in 1997, the company launched its restaurant reservation system, for which it is best known, in 2007, initially with a selection of restaurants in Edinburgh. As of July 2014, the company has 870 restaurant clients in 11 countries, and is the largest supplier in New Zealand and Chile (under a subsidiary Reservarte); and the second largest supplier in the US, by online reservations.  In 2014, Eveve's operations in Texas expanded significantly 

2015 saw accelerated expansion as Eveve gained market share in Seattle  and Denver  
.

See also
 List of websites about food and drink

References

External links
 
 Eveve New Zealand

Companies based in Edinburgh
Companies established in 1997
1997 establishments in Scotland
Online companies of the United Kingdom
Computer_reservation_systems